Gary George was a Republican politician from the US state of Oregon. He was a member of the Oregon State Senate from 1997 to 2009, representing District 12.

George and his wife Kathy owned a hazelnut farm and processing plant and a christmas tree farm outside Newberg. They have five children including former state senator Larry George (R-OR, 13th).

George ran for a seat in the Oregon House of Representatives in 1990, but lost. He first won a seat in the Senate in 1996.

George and Representative Kim Thatcher led an unsuccessful effort in 2008 to repeal gay rights legislation passed by the 2007 legislature.

See also 
 Seventy-third Oregon Legislative Assembly
 Charles Starr

References 

Republican Party Oregon state senators
People from Newberg, Oregon
Farmers from Oregon
Living people
21st-century American politicians
Year of birth missing (living people)